Tol Rigi or Tall-e Rigi or Tal Rigi or  may refer to:
 Tol Rigi, Jahrom
 Tall-e Rigi, Zarrin Dasht